Alhaj Adam Omari Kimbisa, better known as Adam Kimbisa, is a Tanzanian politician, currently serving the East African Legislative Assembly, better known as EALA. Prior to this, Hon. Kimbisa served as the mayor of the city of Dar es Salaam from 2006 to 2010 as well as general secretary of the Red Cross of Tanzania. Before being elected as Dar es Salaam's mayor, he has served in other government institutions, including Tanzanian's Ministry of Foreign Affairs.

See also
 List of mayors of Dar es Salaam
 Timeline of Dar es Salaam

References

Tanzanian politicians
Dar es Salaam
Living people
Year of birth missing (living people)